To Yuen Tung is a village in Tai Po District, Hong Kong.

Administration
To Yuen Tung is a recognized village under the New Territories Small House Policy.

References

External links
 Delineation of area of existing village To Yuen Tung (Tai Po) for election of resident representative (2019 to 2022)

Villages in Tai Po District, Hong Kong